= Samosapedia =

Crowd-sourced South Asian lingo guide

Samosapedia was a crowd-sourced South Asian language and culture website which provided a guide to the English words and phrases of South Asia.

It was founded in 2011 by Vikram Bhaskaran, Arun Ranganathan, Braxton Robbason and Arvind Thyagarajan. The website is defunct as of December 2022.
